George David Beavan (born 12 January 1990) is an English footballer who plays as a defender for Tonbridge Angels in the Isthmian League Premier Division.

Career
Beavan was given a trial at Luton in 2006 by then youth team coach Marvin Johnson, and was a member of the youth team for the 2006–07 season. He made his first team debut in the 4–1 defeat at home to Bournemouth on 9 February 2008 as a substitute, and made one more appearance that season as Luton were relegated to League Two.

Beavan joined Conference side Salisbury City on a month's loan in September 2008 and made his debut in a 1–0 victory against Woking. He returned to Luton having made three appearances.

Beavan made a further four league appearances for Luton in the 2008–09 season, as well as playing in the Football League Trophy victories over Walsall and Colchester United. In January 2009, he signed for Conference side Grays Athletic on loan until the end of the season, where he made nineteen league appearances, scoring once and helping them avoid relegation.

He started the following season, 2009–10, at Luton before returning to Grays Athletic on 17 August, where he made six appearances in a four-month loan spell. Beavan failed to play again during the season, and was released by Luton on 31 May 2010.

He joined Fisher in January 2012.

Honours
Luton Town
Football League Trophy winner: 2008–09

References

External links

1990 births
Living people
English footballers
Association football defenders
Luton Town F.C. players
Salisbury City F.C. players
Grays Athletic F.C. players
Fisher F.C. players
Billericay Town F.C. players
Tonbridge Angels F.C. players
English Football League players
National League (English football) players
Isthmian League players